Austrocidaria parora is a species of moth of the family Geometridae. It is endemic to New Zealand.

Taxonomy 
This species was described by Edward Meyrick in 1884 as Harpalyce parora. In 1886 Meyrick recognised that the genus name he had used for this species had been used previously and renamed the genus in which he placed this species as Probolaea. In 1898 George Hudson placed this species within the Asaphodes genus. In 1906 George Howes, discussing the species under the  name Asaphodes parora, also illustrated it. In 1928 Hudson discussed and  illustrated the species again under the name Asaphodes parora. In 1988 J. S. Dugdale placed this species within the genus Austrocidaria.

The lectotype specimen is held at the Natural History Museum, London.

Description 
Hudson described this species in 1898 as follows:

It is regarded as being variable in colour.

Distribution 
Austrocidaria parora is endemic to New Zealand. The lectotype specimen was collected at Riccarton Bush in Christchurch. This species has also been collected at Mount Ruapehu, Whanganui, Lake Horowhenua, Wellington, Greymouth, Mount Hutt, Central Otago, and Invercargill.

Behaviour and biology 
Adults have been recorded as being on wing in January and February as well as in August and September.  The larvae feed on Coprosma species.

References

External links

Image of lectotype specimen

Xanthorhoini
Moths of New Zealand
Moths described in 1884
Endemic fauna of New Zealand
Taxa named by Edward Meyrick
Endemic moths of New Zealand